Lebanese Sunni Muslims refers to Lebanese people who are adherents of the Sunni branch of Islam in Lebanon, which is one of the largest denomination in Lebanon tied with Shias. Sunni Islam in Lebanon has a history of more than a millennium. According to a CIA 2018 study, Lebanese Sunni Muslims constitute an estimated 30.6% of Lebanon's population. (However, in a country that had last census in 1932, it is difficult to have correct population estimates)

The Lebanese Sunni Muslims are highly concentrated in Lebanon's capital city - Beirut (West Beirut /or Beirut II), as well as Tripoli, Sidon, Western Beqaa, and in the countryside of the Akkar, Arsal. They also have a notable presence in Zahlé, Southern Lebanon, Marjaayoun and Chebaa.

Under the terms of an unwritten agreement known as the National Pact between the various political and religious leaders of Lebanon, Sunni notables traditionally held power in the Lebanese state together, and they are still the only ones eligible for the post of Prime Minister.

History

Origins 
The cultural and linguistic heritage of the Lebanese people is a blend of both indigenous Phoenician elements, Arab culture and the foreign cultures that have come to rule the land and its people over the course of thousands of years. In an interview from 2013, the lead investigator, Pierre Zalloua, pointed out that genetic variation preceded religious variation and divisions: ''Lebanon already had well-differentiated communities with their own genetic peculiarities, but not significant differences, and religions came as layers of paint on top. There is no distinct pattern that shows that one community carries significantly more Phoenician than another."

Genetics 

Genealogical DNA testing has shown that 27,7% of Lebanese Muslims (non-Druze) belong to the Y-DNA haplogroup J1. Although there is common ancestral roots, these studies show some difference was found between Muslims and non-Muslims in Lebanon, of whom only 17.1% have this haplotype. As haplogroup J1 finds its putative origins in the Arabian peninsula, this likely means that the lineage was introduced by Arabs beginning at the time of the 7th century Muslim conquest of the Levant and has persisted among the Muslim population ever since. On the other hand, only 4.7% of all Lebanese Muslims belong to haplogroup R1b, compared to 9.6% of Lebanese Christians. Modern Muslims in Lebanon thus do not seem to have a significant genetic influence from the Crusaders, who probably introduced this common Western European marker to the extant Christian populations of the Levant when they were active in the region from 1096 until around the turn of the 14th century. Haplogroup J2 is also a significant marker in throughout Lebanon (27%). This marker is found in many inhabitants of Lebanon, regardless of religion, signals pre-Arab descendants, including the Phoenicians. These genetic studies show us there is no significant differences between the Muslims and non-Muslims of Lebanon.

Relations

With Saudi Arabia
The Sunnis of Lebanon have close ties with Saudi Arabia, who supports them financially. Moreover, Tripoli, the stronghold of the Lebanese Sunnis, is also the birthplace of Lebanon's Salafi Movement.

With Lebanese Alawites and Syria
The Lebanese Sunni Muslims initially opposed the creation of the Lebanese state separated from Syria, where the majority of the population was also Sunni Muslim, and wanted the territory of present-day Lebanon to be incorporated within the so-called Greater Syria.

Sunni Muslims and Alawites have been in conflict with each other for centuries. The Alawites of the Levant were oppressed by the Sunni Ottoman Empire, but gained power and influence when the French recruited Alawites as soldiers during the French mandate of Syria. After independence from France, their co-religionists, the Assad family, came to power in Syria in 1970.

Over the years, there have been numerous clashes between the Sunni and Alawi communities in Tripoli, particularly over the past 14 months since Syria's uprising began, as part of the Arab Spring that started in Tunisia. The deadliest exchange took place last June, when seven people were killed and more than 60 wounded, after Sunni Muslims staged a protest against the Syrian government.

At the best of times, the Alawites are regarded by Sunnis as heretics; at times of tension, when thousands of Sunnis in Syria are being killed, they are regarded as the enemy. And when a popular Sunni figure is strangely abducted and arrested by Lebanon's General Security Service – an organization linked to the Hezbollah militia that, in turn, is linked to the Syrian government – the Alawites become the whipping boys.

Geographic distribution within Lebanon
Lebanese Sunni Muslims are concentrated in cities of west Beirut, Tripoli, Sidon and in north Lebanon in the Akkar and minyeh dinnieh districts, middle and west bekaa, Chouf district and laqlouq in mount lebanon , hasbaya district, and Northeastern Beqaa Valley mainly in and around the city of Arsal.

Demographics

Note that the following percentages are estimates only. However, in a country that had last census in 1932, it is difficult to have correct population estimates.

The last census in Lebanon in 1932 put the numbers of Sunnis at 22% of the population (178,100 of 791,700). A study done by the Central Intelligence Agency (CIA) in 1985 put the numbers of Sunnis at 27% of the population (595,000 of 2,228,000). Sunni Muslims constitute 27% of Lebanon's population, according to a 2012 estimate. And more recently, in 2018 the CIA World Factbook estimated that Sunni Muslims constitute 30.6% of Lebanon's population.

Notable Lebanese Sunni Muslims

Activists and journalists 
 Anbara Salam Khalidi, a feminist, translator and author, who significantly contributed to the emancipation of Arab women
 Nahla Chahal, writer, journalist, researcher, and activist

Artists
 Randa Chahal Sabag, film director, producer and screenwriter 
 Suzanne Tamim, the late singer
 Fadl Shaker, singer
 Walid Toufic, singer
 Wael Jassar, singer

Politicians, Diplomats, and Public Servants 
Mohamad Rassoul
 Salim Ali Salam, former deputy from Beirut to the Ottoman Parliament, former President of the Municipality of Beirut, and former President of the Muslim Society of Benevolent Intentions (al-Makassed)
 Saeb Salam, politician, who served as Prime Minister six times between 1952 and 1973
  Mohamad Harmouche, Honorary consul of Belize to Lebanon 
 Riad Al Solh, the first Prime Minister of Lebanon (1943–1945), after the country's independence
 Emir Khaled Chehab, former Prime Minister of Lebanon and Speaker of the Parliament of Lebanon.
 Rafik Hariri, assassinated former Prime Minister of Lebanon
 Saad Hariri, former Prime Minister of Lebanon
 Fouad Siniora, former Prime Minister of Lebanon
 Abdul Hamid Karami, former Prime Minister of Lebanon
 Omar Karami, former Prime Minister of Lebanon
 Rashid Karami, former Prime Minister of Lebanon
 Najib Mikati, Prime Minister of Lebanon
 Tammam Salam, politician and current Prime Minister of Lebanon
 Mohamad Chatah,  assassinated Lebanese economist and diplomat
 Ashraf Rifi, former major general and director of the Lebanese Internal Security Forces and current minister of justice
 Hassan Diab, former prime minister of Lebanon
 Salam Yamout, current president of the Lebanese National Bloc political party
 Nawaf Salam, a diplomat, jurist, and academic. He acted as judge on the International Court of Justice for the 2018-2027 term

 Wissam al-Hassan, assassinated brigadier general at the Lebanese Internal Security Forces (ISF)
 Ali Al Hajj, former major general and director of the Lebanese Internal Security Forces

Religious Figures 
 Hassan Khaled, late former leader of Lebanon's Sunni Muslim community

Businessmen 
 Al-Waleed bin Talal, Saudi-Lebanese businessman and grandson of Riad Al Solh, Lebanon's first Prime Minister

Sportsman 
 Hazem El Masri, Lebanese-Australian professional rugby league player

See also
 Religion in Lebanon
 Lebanese Shia Muslims
 Lebanese Druze
 Lebanese Maronite Christians
 Lebanese Melkite Christians
 Lebanese Greek Orthodox Christians
 Lebanese Protestant Christians
 Bab al-Tabbaneh–Jabal Mohsen conflict

References